Rondonia is a monotypic genus of nematodes belonging to the family Atractidae. The only species is Rondonia rondoni.

The species is found in freshwater environments.

References

Rhabditida
Nematodes described in 1920